WGC may refer to:
Welwyn Garden City, town in Hertfordshire, England
Willard Grant Conspiracy
William Gershom Collingwood, artist
World Gliding Championships
World Gold Council, a non-profit association of the world's leading gold mining companies
World Golf Championships
Writers Guild of Canada
Warangal Airport, the IATA Airport code
Weak gravity conjecture, a hypothesis in theoretical physics